A ratel (Mellivora capensis) is a small mammal, also known as a honey badger.

Ratel may also refer to:
Radio Telecommunications, a method of communicating over a radio used in the Australian Army and Australian Army Cadets
Ratel IFV, a family of wheeled infantry vehicles in service with the South African Army
Stéphane Ratel Organisation, organizer of the FIA GT Championship, ADAC GT Masters, Belcar, FIA GT3 and other motorsport series
Ratel, a software application part of the Okapi Framework to create and maintain SRX segmentation rules
Ratel, The codename assigned to Hitomi Uzaki, the main character from the Japanese manga series Killing Bites who is a genetically engineered hybrid of a human and a honey badger.